A Jolly Bad Fellow (US: They all Died Laughing) is a 1964 British black comedy film directed by Don Chaffey. It stars Leo McKern and Janet Munro.

Cast
 Leo McKern as Prof Bowles-Ottery
 Janet Munro as Delia Brooks
 Maxine Audley as Clarina Bowles-Ottery
 Duncan Macrae as Dr Brass
 Dennis Price as Prof Hughes
 Miles Malleson as Dr Woolley 
 Leonard Rossiter as Dr Fisher 
 Alan Wheatley as Epicene 
 Patricia Jessel as Mrs Pugh-Smith 
 Dinsdale Landen as Fred 
 George Benson as Inspector Butts.

Plot
Kerris Bowles-Ottery is professor of science at the University of Ockham. To advance his career, he poisons inconvenient colleagues with an untraceable substance he has discovered that induces hysteria and manic behaviour followed by death. His research assistant, Delia, blackmails him into a promise of marriage, but he remains attached to his wife, and poisons Delia. When the police arrive at his home to question him, he flees in his car but fatally crashes it as a result of smoking a poisoned cigarette that his wife has unknowingly brought from his laboratory.

Reception
In a 2017 study of Bryanston Films, Duncan Petrie writes that the film did not make "any impact either commercially or critically" When the film was released in the US (under the title They All Died Laughing), The New York Times called it "nonconformist but not especially sidesplitting" although having "a deftly casual air about it as well as the polish of professionalism".

References

External links

1964 films
1964 comedy films
1960s black comedy films
1960s satirical films
British black-and-white films
British black comedy films
British Lion Films films
British satirical films
1960s English-language films
Films based on British novels
Films directed by Don Chaffey
Films scored by John Barry (composer)
Films set in universities and colleges
Films shot at Shepperton Studios
1960s British films